George Jakowenko (born June 26, 1948) is a former American football placekicker who played in the National Football League. He was active for two seasons, once for the Oakland Raiders in 1974, and once for the Buffalo Bills in 1976. He was the first Bill to wear the number 5.

References

Living people
American football placekickers
Belgian players of American football
Buffalo Bills players
Oakland Raiders players
Players of American football from Syracuse, New York
1948 births